Sep. 20 - Eastern Orthodox liturgical calendar - Sep. 22

All fixed commemorations below celebrated on October 4 by Orthodox Churches on the Old Calendar.

For September 21st, Orthodox Churches on the Old Calendar commemorate the Saints listed on September 8.

Feasts
 Apodosis of the Exaltation of the Cross.

Saints
 Prophet Jonah (8th century BC) (see also: September 22 )
 Apostle Quadratus of the Seventy, Apologist (c. 130)
 Martyr Eusebius of Phoenicia (2nd century)
 Holy Six Martyrs, by the sword (298)
 Martyr Priscus of Phrygia.
 Martyrs Eusebius, Nestabus, Zeno, brothers, with Nestor and Busiris, of Gaza (360-363)
 Martyr Bassa of Tyre.
 Hieromartyr Hypatius, Bishop of Ephesus, and his Presbyter Andrew (730)  (see also: September 20)
 Venerable Jonah the Sabbaite, the Presbiter (9th century), father of Sts. Theophanes the Hymnographer and Theodore Graptus (see also: September 22 )
 Venerables Isaacius (Akakios) and Meletius, Bishops of Sitis (Σίτης) in Cyprus.

Pre-Schism Western saints
 Saint Alexander, a bishop in the neighbourhood of Rome (2nd century)
 Saint Pamphilus, a martyr in Rome.
 Saint Mabyn (Mabena), a Cornish saint (6th century)
 Saint Gerulfus (Gerulph), a saint of Flanders (c. 746)
 Saint Maura, a holy virgin in Troyes, she reposed at the age of twenty-three after a life of prayer and good works (850)

Post-Schism Orthodox saints
 Venerable Daniel, founder of Shuzhgorsk Monastery, Belozersk (16th century)
 Saint Joseph, founder of Zaonikiev Monastery, Vologda (1612)

New martyrs and confessors
 New Hieromartyrs Alexander Fedoseyev, Alexis Stabnikov, Constantine Shirokinsky, and John Flerov, Priests (1918)
 New Hieromartyr Archimandrite Platon (Aivazidis), Protosyncellus of Metropolitan Germanos Karavangelis of Amasya (1921)
 New Hieromartyr Theophan (Tuliakov), Metropolitan of Lipetsk and Belorussia (1937)
 New Hieromartyr Maurice (Poletaev), Archimandrite, of Yuriev-Polsky, and with him Martyr Basil Kondratiev (1937)
 New Hieromartyrs Valentine Nikolsky, Alexander Belyakov, John Lazarev, Andrew Benedictov, Peter Sakharovsky, and John Nikolsky, Priests (1937)
 New Hieromartyr John Bystrov, Priest (1938)
 New Hieromartyr Basil Krymkin, Priest (1942)

Other commemorations
 Uncovering of the relics (1752) of St. Demetrius, Metropolitan of Rostov (1709)
 Repose of Arseny (Chagovstsov), Archbishop of Winnipeg (1945)
 Repose of Priest Dumitru Staniloae of Romania (1993)
 Synaxis of the Saints of Uglich.
 Synaxis of the Church of "Panagia Giatrissa" ("The Healer"), on Therasia in the Greek Cyclades (1950s)

Icon gallery

Notes

References

Sources
 September 21/October 4. Orthodox Calendar (PRAVOSLAVIE.RU).
 October 4 / September 21. HOLY TRINITY RUSSIAN ORTHODOX CHURCH (A parish of the Patriarchate of Moscow).
 September 21. OCA - The Lives of the Saints.
 The Autonomous Orthodox Metropolia of Western Europe and the Americas (ROCOR). St. Hilarion Calendar of Saints for the year of our Lord 2004. St. Hilarion Press (Austin, TX). pp. 70–71.
 The Twenty-First Day of the Month of September. Orthodoxy in China.
 September 21. Latin Saints of the Orthodox Patriarchate of Rome.
 The Roman Martyrology. Transl. by the Archbishop of Baltimore. Last Edition, According to the Copy Printed at Rome in 1914. Revised Edition, with the Imprimatur of His Eminence Cardinal Gibbons. Baltimore: John Murphy Company, 1916. pp. 291–292.
 Rev. Richard Stanton. A Menology of England and Wales, or, Brief Memorials of the Ancient British and English Saints Arranged According to the Calendar, Together with the Martyrs of the 16th and 17th Centuries. London: Burns & Oates, 1892. pp. 454–455.
Greek Sources
 Great Synaxaristes:  21 ΣΕΠΤΕΜΒΡΙΟΥ. ΜΕΓΑΣ ΣΥΝΑΞΑΡΙΣΤΗΣ.
  Συναξαριστής. 21 Σεπτεμβρίου. ECCLESIA.GR. (H ΕΚΚΛΗΣΙΑ ΤΗΣ ΕΛΛΑΔΟΣ).
  21/09/2016. Ορθόδοξος Συναξαριστής. 
Russian Sources
  4 октября (21 сентября). Православная Энциклопедия под редакцией Патриарха Московского и всея Руси Кирилла (электронная версия). (Orthodox Encyclopedia - Pravenc.ru).
  21 сентября по старому стилю / 4 октября по новому стилю. Русская Православная Церковь - Православный церковный календарь на 2016 год.

September in the Eastern Orthodox calendar